Oleg Georgiyevich Bovin (born 20 June 1946 in Moscow) is a Russian water polo player who competed for the Soviet Union in the 1968 Summer Olympics.

See also
 Soviet Union men's Olympic water polo team records and statistics
 List of Olympic medalists in water polo (men)
 List of men's Olympic water polo tournament goalkeepers

External links
 

1946 births
Living people
Sportspeople from Moscow
Soviet male water polo players
Russian male water polo players
Water polo goalkeepers
Olympic water polo players of the Soviet Union
Water polo players at the 1968 Summer Olympics
Olympic silver medalists for the Soviet Union
Olympic medalists in water polo
Medalists at the 1968 Summer Olympics